Porsha Ferguson (born November 8, 1989) is an American actress. She is known for her role  Zena on The Haves and the Have Nots and has also appeared in feature films including Free in Deed, Breathe, Closet Space, and The Last Punch. She has starred in the film Soul Ties and episodes of TV One’s channel Fatal Attraction, Justice By Any Means and the Investigation Discovery series, Homicide Hunter.

Career
Ferguson first appeared on the VH1 series Single Ladies. In 2014 she made her major acting debut on TV One's series, Fatal Attraction following performances in several independent films. In Fatal Attraction Ferguson played lead real-life character Elicia Hughes, a woman on trial for murdering her husband, Eric Hughes in Jackson, Mississippi in 2004. Ferguson played in the  film, The Last Punch as front desk clerk, Creamy in Breathe, and as a church member in Free in Deed. She appeared in the pilot By Any Means, directed by The Facts of Life actress, Kim Fields. Ferguson also starred and produced for the film Closet Space and the series Twisted Mines. In June 2015 she joined the cast of Tyler Perry’s The Haves and the Have Nots as the role of Zena.  She also starred in Soul Ties and in episodes of TV One’s series Justice: By Any Means as Detective Johanna Phillips and Investigation Discovery series Homicide Hunter as Kathy Crow.

Filmography

Film

Television

References

External links 
 Porsha Ferguson Official Website
 

Living people
1989 births
African-American actresses
21st-century American actresses
21st-century African-American women
21st-century African-American people
20th-century African-American people
20th-century African-American women